Opal is a gemstone.

Opal or OPAL may also refer to:

Places

Canada
 Opal, Alberta
 Opal Hills, Jasper National Park, Alberta
 Opal Cone, a volcano in British Columbia

United States
 Opal, Missouri, an unincorporated community
 Opal, South Dakota, an unincorporated community
 Opal, Virginia, a census-designated place
 Opal, Wyoming, a town

Science and technology

Biology and medicine
 Opal (apple), a variety of apple produced by crossing Golden Delicious and Topaz varieties
 Opal (butterfly), common name for the butterfly genus Chrysoritis
 Omeprazole or Opal, a drug
 Opal phytolith, a rigid microscopic body that occurs in many plants
 Opal, a stop codon
 Open Air Laboratories, an initiative in England to get the public more involved with nature

Computing
 OPAL (software) (Open Physics Abstraction Layer), a real-time physics engine
 Opal programming language, developed at the Technical University of Berlin
 Open Phone Abstraction Library (OPAL), a fork of the H323plus project supporting H.323, SIP, IAX2
 Opal Storage Specification, a storage specification developed by the Trusted Computing Group

Physics
 Open-pool Australian lightwater reactor, a scientific facility in Sydney, Australia
 OPAL experiment and detector, of the Large Electron-Positron Collider at CERN

Arts and entertainment
 The Opal (annual), an annual gift book from 1844 to 1849
 Opal (band), a 1980s rock band from Los Angeles, US

Fictional entities
 Opal (EastEnders) a character on the BBC soap opera EastEnders
 Opal (The Simpsons), a talk show host on The Simpsons
 Opal City, a fictional city in the DC Comics universe
 Opal, a fictional character in the Cartoon Network show Steven Universe
 Opal, a fictional character in the Nickelodeon show The Legend of Korra
 Opal, a Pokémon character in the video games Pokémon Sword and Shield

Ships
 HMS Opal, two ships of the British Royal Navy
 USS Opal (PYc-8), a United States Navy patrol vessel during World War II

Transportation

 Opal (fuel), a brand of petrol produced by BP Australia
 Opal (armoured personnel carrier), a Polish vehicle
 Opal card, a smart card used on Sydney's transport network

Other uses
 Opal (given name)
 OPAL pipeline, a natural gas pipeline in Germany
 The Opal, a journal written by the patients of the Utica State Lunatic Asylum c. 1851
 Tropical Storm Opal, several tropical cyclones worldwide have been named Opal
 Opal Telecom, a former UK business broadband and telephone provider, now known as TalkTalk Business
 Opal Tower (Leeds), a skyscraper in Leeds, England
 Opal Tower (Sydney), a skyscraper in Sydney, Australia
 Australia women's national basketball team or the Opals
 Opal, a product by Nói Síríus

See also
 Upal, a town in Xinjiang, China
 Opals (disambiguation)